Shuangliu Forest Recreation Area is a forest in Caopu Village, Shizi Township, Pingtung County, Taiwan.

Geology
The highest point of the forest is Mount Maozi.

Facilities
For hiking purpose, the forest consists of four different trails, which are the Banyan trail, mountainside trail, Mount Maozi trail and waterfall trail. It has other facilities such as the Forest Classroom, Power of Nature, a nature center and the Sunshine Lawn.

Transportation
The forest is accessible by bus from Taitung Station of Taiwan Railways.

See also
 Geography of Taiwan

References

External links
 

Forests of Taiwan
Geography of Pingtung County
Tourist attractions in Pingtung County